Inomata (written: 猪又, 猪俣 or 猪股) is a Japanese surname. Notable people with the surname include:

, Japanese diplomat
, Japanese illustrator and animator
Takeshi Inomata, Japanese jazz drummer and bandleader
, Japanese cross-country skier
, Professor in Sports Science, Emeritus.Chukyo University

Fictional characters
, a character in the manga series School Babysitters

Japanese-language surnames